Events in the year 1885 in Iceland.

Incumbents 

 Monarch: Christian IX
 Minister for Iceland: Johannes Nellemann

Events 

 The National Bank (Landsbanki) is founded in Reykjavik.
 Iceland begins issuing its own Danish Krone banknotes.

Births 

 1 May – Jónas Jónsson, educator and politician.
 15 October – Jóhannes Sveinsson Kjarval, painter.

References 

 
1880s in Iceland
Years of the 19th century in Iceland
Iceland
Iceland